Orlinoye is a rural locality (a selo) in Gmelinskoye Rural Settlement, Staropoltavsky District, Volgograd Oblast, Russia. The population was 73 as of 2010.

Geography 
Orlinoye is located in steppe, 47 km southeast of Staraya Poltavka (the district's administrative centre) by road. Gmelinka is the nearest rural locality.

References 

Rural localities in Staropoltavsky District